Sey Gar Azim Khan (also Romanized as Sey Gar ʿAẓīm Khān) is a village in Kuhdasht-e Shomali Rural District, in the Central District of Kuhdasht County, Lorestan Province, Iran. At the 2006 census, its population was 27, in 6 families.

References 

Towns and villages in Kuhdasht County